The Traveling Kind is a 2015 studio album from American roots musicians Rodney Crowell and Emmylou Harris, their second collaboration after 2013's Old Yellow Moon. The album has received praise from critics. The duo managed to record this album more quickly than their former release, but took longer composing original songs, rather than focusing on cover versions, as with their last album.

Reception
Editorial staff at AnyDecentMusic? aggregate reviews for this album at 7.3 out of 10, with nine reviews. Editors at AllMusic Guide gave The Traveling Kind 3.5 out of five stars, with reviewer Mark Deming noting "Harris' sweet, firm, very human tone as well as Crowell's outwardly cocky but inwardly perceptive voice, and the sweet and sour push and pull complements them both". John Paul of PopMatters scored this release an eight out of 10, praising the alternating moods of the lyrics and the musicians' sense of identity in the country music tradition, summing up, that there is "no better vocal pairing working today".  Pastes Holly Gleason rated The Traveling Kind an 8.5 out of 10, also noting the diverse feelings present in the lyrics. In Rolling Stone, Corinne Cummings gave this release three out of five stars, noting that "their creative partnership sounds stronger than ever". For NPR's First Listen, Jewly Hight notes that the musicians "draw out the best in each other".

Jim Beviglia of American Songwriter scored the album four out of five stars, repeatedly noting how well the two musicians complement one another. Maeri Ferguson of Glide Magazine rated The Traveling Kind eight out of 10, opining that "the songs on this record sound like they just flowed out of them like the most natural thing in the world". For The Arts Desk, Thomas H. Green compares this release favorably to the duo's last collaboration, calling this "perhaps more spirited, and certainly a match for anything in either singer's recent solo back catalogue"; he rated it four out of five stars. In The Chicago Tribune, Greg Kot scored this album three out of four, noting a strength of this release over Old Yellow Moon is the introduction of new songs over cover versions. Elysa Gardner of USA Today scored The Traveling Kind 3.5 out of four stars, also praising the new compositions, as well as Harris' vocal strengths and the production work of Joe Henry.

Track listing
"The Traveling Kind" (Cory Chisel, Rodney Crowell, and Emmylou Harris) – 3:40
"No Memories Hanging Round" (Crowell) – 3:41
"Bring It On Home to Memphis" (Crowell and Larry Klein) – 3:37
"You Can't Say We Didn't Try" (Chisel, Crowell, and Harris) – 3:26
"The Weight of the World" (Crowell and Harris) – 4:34
"Higher Mountains" (Crowell and Will Jennings) – 4:11
"I Just Wanted to See You So Bad" (Lucinda Williams) – 3:02
"Just Pleasing You" (Crowell and Mary Karr) – 4:21
"If You Lived Here You'd Be Home Now" (Crowell) – 2:59
"Her Hair Was Red" (Amy Allison) – 2:42
"Le Danse De La Joie" (Crowell, Harris, and Jennings) – 4:22

Personnel
"The Traveling Kind"
Rodney Crowell – acoustic guitar, vocals
Emmylou Harris – vocals
Byron House – double bass
Jedd Hughes – mandolin
Jerry Roe – drums
Steuart Smith – classical guitar
Chris Tuttle – piano
"No Memories Hanging Round"
Rodney Crowell – acoustic guitar, vocals
Emmylou Harris – vocals
Steve Fishell – steel guitar
Larry Franklin – violin
Byron House – electric bass
Jedd Hughes – electric guitar
Bill Payne – piano
Jerry Roe – drums
"Bring It On Home to Memphis"
Rodney Crowell – acoustic guitar, vocals
Emmylou Harris – vocals
Byron House – double bass
Jedd Hughes – electric guitar, backing vocals
Jerry Roe – drums, backing vocals
Steuart Smith – electric slide guitar
Chris Tuttle – piano
"You Can't Say We Didn't Try"
Rodney Crowell – acoustic guitar, vocals
Emmylou Harris – vocals
Steve Fishell – slide guitar
Byron House – electric bass
Jedd Hughes – electric guitar
Bill Payne – Fender Rhodes electric piano, organ
Jerry Roe – drums
"The Weight of the World"
Rodney Crowell – acoustic guitar, vocals
Emmylou Harris – vocals
Byron House – double bass
Jedd Hughes – electric guitar
Bill Payne – Wurlitzer organ
Jerry Roe – drums
"Higher Mountains"
Rodney Crowell – acoustic guitar, vocals
Emmylou Harris – vocals
Byron House – double bass
Jedd Hughes – octave guitar
Bill Payne – piano
Jerry Roe – drums
Steuart Smith – electric guitar, piano, organ
"I Just Wanted to See You So Bad"
Rodney Crowell – acoustic guitar, vocals
Emmylou Harris – vocals
Byron House – electric bass
Jedd Hughes – electric guitar
Bill Payne – piano
Jerry Roe – drums
Steuart Smith – organ
"Just Pleasing You"
Rodney Crowell – acoustic guitar, vocals
Emmylou Harris – backing vocals
Larry Franklin – violin
Byron House – double bass
Jerry Roe – drums
Chris Scruggs – steel guitar
Steuart Smith – electric guitar
"If You Lived Here You'd Be Home Now"
Rodney Crowell – acoustic guitar, vocals
Emmylou Harris – backing vocals
Steve Fishell – lap steel guitar
Byron House – double bass
Jedd Hughes – mandolin
Jerry Roe – drums
Steuart Smith – electric guitar
Chris Tuttle – piano
"Her Hair Was Red"
Rodney Crowell – vocals
Emmylou Harris – vocals
Jedd Hughes – octave guitar
Steuart Smith – classical guitar, piano
"Le Danse De La Joie"
Rodney Crowell – vocals
Emmylou Harris – vocals
Larry Franklin – violin
Byron House – double bass
Jedd Hughes – octave guitar, backing vocals
Bill Payne – piano
Jerry Roe – drums
Steuart Smith – electric guitar
Chris Tuttle – accordion

Technical personnel
Adeline Brue – artwork
Greg Calbi – mastering at Sterling Sound
Doyle Partners – design
Joe Henry – production
David McClister – photography
Justin Niebank – recording, mixing
Chris Wilkinson – recording

See also
List of 2015 albums

References

External links

2015 albums
Rodney Crowell albums
Emmylou Harris albums
Collaborative albums
Nonesuch Records albums
Albums produced by Joe Henry